Mishka Lavigne is a Canadian playwright. She is a two-time winner of the Governor General's Award for French-language drama, for Havre at the 2019 Governor General's Awards and for Copeaux at the 2021 Governor General's Awards.

A graduate of the University of Ottawa, she was the first writer based outside of Quebec to win a GG in the drama category since Emma Haché in 2004.

She was one of the winners, alongside Christophe Bernard, of the Prix Québec-Ontario from the Salon du livre de Toronto in 2017 for her first published play, Cinéma.

References

Living people
21st-century Canadian dramatists and playwrights
21st-century Canadian women writers
Canadian women dramatists and playwrights
Canadian dramatists and playwrights in French
Franco-Ontarian people
University of Ottawa alumni
Writers from Ontario
Governor General's Award-winning dramatists
Year of birth missing (living people)